WWNN (1470 kHz) is a commercial radio station licensed to Pompano Beach, Florida, and serving Fort Lauderdale and West Palm Beach. The station is owned by Vic Canales, through licensee Vic Canales Media Group, LLC.  The studios are in Boca Raton.  Part of the day, the station airs brokered programming, where hosts pay for their time and may advertise their products or services during their shows.  The rest of the day, the station carries The True Oldies Channel.

By day, WWNN is powered at 30,000 watts.  It uses a directional antenna with a four-tower array to avoid interfering with stations in the Miami area on 1450 and 1490 kHz.  At night, to further reduce interference to other stations, the power is reduced to 2,500 watts.  The transmitter is on NW 44th Street, near Florida's Turnpike, in Tamarac.  Programming is also heard on two FM translators:  95.3 W237BD in Boca Raton and 96.9 W245BC in Lauderdale Lakes.

History

WPOM
In 1958, Gold Coast Broadcasters was granted a construction permit from the Federal Communications Commission. It was given the call sign WPOM. Almardon, Inc., acquired WPOM in 1961.

WRBD
In May 1963, WPOM became WRBD ("Radio Broward").  The studios were on Rock Island Road in Tamarac.  Four months later, WRBD became the first radio station in Broward County oriented to the local African American community.  It featured South Florida radio legends like Joe Fisher, "The Crown Prince" and "The Mad Hatter". 

WRBD's Radio Broward designation turned into "Rockin' Big Daddy" as the format changed. A similarly formatted FM sister station, the mostly automated WRBD-FM 102.7, launched in December 1969.  It became WCKO in 1971, playing disco music, and remained Black-oriented throughout the 1970s. The pair became charter affiliates of the Mutual Black Network in 1972.

Rose Broadcasting acquired WRBD and WCKO for $2 million in 1978. The new owners flipped the disco-formatted FM to album-oriented rock as "K-102" the next year, to reduce overlap between the two stations' target markets.

Rose owned the two stations until their acquisition by Sconnix Broadcasting in 1985, a $7 million deal. Sconnix replaced WCKO's rock format with adult contemporary as WMXJ that March. In 1986, an investor group led by John Ruffin, a Black supermarket executive, acquired the AM station from Sconnix for $2 million; the sellers retained WMXJ. WRBD thus became the first Black-owned radio station in South Florida. The split resolved a culture clash between the mostly Black AM staff and the white FM staff, much of which Sconnix had imported from other markets the year prior; Ruffin renovated the neglected studios. By 1991, however, facing financial difficulties and heavy competition from FM stations, WRBD had filed for Chapter 11 bankruptcy protection.

James Thomas ("James T") and Jerry Rushin bought the station from Ruffin in 1992.

WWNN

In 1997, citing competition from FM stations that were obtaining higher ratings, WRBD's ownership, including Rushin, sold the station to Howard Goldsmith, owner of WSBR (740 AM) and WWNN (980 AM). Rushin then went on to become the general manager of WEDR (99.1 FM). James T had been a DJ on WRBD early in his career. The health talk and motivational programming of WWNN, established as the "Winner's News Network" in 1987, moved from the 980 signal to 1470 AM; 980 became a primarily Haitian ethnic station as WHSR. Beasley Broadcast Group of Naples acquired Goldsmith's three broadcasting outlets in 2000 for $18 million.

WWNN retained the "WNN" name and branded as "Your Health and Wealth Network" until early 2019, when it changed its imaging to "WWNN, South Florida's Talk".

South Florida's MoneyTalk Network
Co-owned WSBR (740 AM) and WHSR concurrently ceased operations at midnight on December 1, 2019, in order to allow for the sale of the associated transmitter site for both stations to Parkland, Florida for $7,100,000.  The city had announced plans in September 2019 to develop a 36-acre park on the land. 

WWNN absorbed WSBR's imaging, becoming "South Florida's MoneyTalk Network", and much of its programming.  It also began broadcasting over its two translators in Boca Raton and Lauderdale Lakes.

Oldies 95.3/96.9
On February 2, 2022, Beasley sold WWNN and its two translators to Marco Broadcasting. The sale was consummated on April 1, 2022, at a price of $1.25 million. 

On May 25, 2022, Marco sold WWNN and its two translators to Vic Canales Media Group. On July 5, 2022, the station added oldies music as "Oldies 95.3/96.9", with music from The True Oldies Channel. The sale to Vic Canales Media Group was consummated on August 19, 2022, at a price of $1.45 million.

Translators
In January 2017, WWNN began simulcasting on W237BD, a translator at 95.3 FM covering Boca Raton, Coral Springs and Parkland. When WSBR closed, WWNN began broadcasting over its former translators: W280DU (103.9 FM), which covers a similar area, and W245BC (96.9 FM), which is licensed to Lauderdale Lakes and adds coverage in east-central and northwestern Broward County.

Previous logo

References

External links

FCC History Cards for WWNN

WNN
Pompano Beach, Florida
1959 establishments in Florida
Radio stations established in 1959
Oldies radio stations in the United States